The Nivolet (1,547 m) is a mountain of the Bauges Massif in the French Prealps near Chambéry in Savoie, France.

References

Mountains of Savoie
Mountains of the Alps